Edin Cocalić (born 5 December 1987) is a Bosnian professional footballer who plays as a centre-back for Bosnian Premier League club Željezničar.

Cocalić began his professional career at Željezničar, before joining Panionios in 2010. Two years later, he moved to Maccabi Haifa. In 2015, he was transferred to Mechelen. Four years later, Cocalić signed with Akhisarspor. Following Akhisarspor, he played for Altay and Panetolikos. In 2022, he returned to Željezničar. 

A former youth international for Bosnia and Herzegovina, Cocalić made his senior international debut in 2015, earning 10 caps until 2017.

Club career

Early career
Cocalić came through Željezničar's youth academy, which he joined in 1999. He made his professional debut in 2006 at the age of 18.

In January 2010, he signed with Greek club Panionios.

In January 2012, Cocalić moved to Israeli outfit Maccabi Haifa.

Mechelen
On 31 January 2015, Cocalić signed a three-and-a-half-year deal with Belgian side Mechelen. A week later, he made his official debut for the club against Charleroi. Two months later, he scored his first goal for Mechelen against Waasland-Beveren.

In January 2017, Cocalić agreed to a new contract expiring in June 2020.

On 23 January 2018, he played his 100th game for the team against St. Truiden.

In spite of Mechelen's relegation to the Belgian First Division B in March 2018, Cocalić decided to stay at the club, and even extended his contract for additional season.

Akhisarspor
On 21 January 2019, Cocalić was transferred to Turkish team Akhisarspor for an undisclosed fee. A week later, on his competitive debut for the club, he scored a goal and saw a straight red card.

Even though Akhisarspor got relegated to the 1. Lig at the end of season, Cocalić chose to stay with the team.

Later career
After leaving Akhisarspor, Cocalić signed with 1. Lig club Altay in September 2020.

On 17 January 2021, he joined Greek club Panetolikos. In November 2021, Cocalić terminated his contract with Panetolikos and left the club.

Return to Željezničar
On 24 January 2022, Cocalić returned to his former club Željezničar, over a decade after he had left the club. On 25 February 2022, he made his second debut for Željezničar, in a 2–0 league loss against Velež Mostar.

On 16 July 2022, Cocalić scored his first goal in the 2022–23 season against Leotar, his first Bosnian Premier League goal since October 2009.

International career
Cocalić represented Bosnia and Herzegovina on all youth levels. He also served as captain of the under-17 team.

In March 2015, he received his first senior call-up, for games against Andorra and Austria. Cocalić debuted in a convincing triumph over the former on 28 March.

Personal life
Cocalić married his long-time girlfriend Merima in March 2010. Together they have two children, a girl and a boy.

Career statistics

Club

International

References

External links

1987 births
Living people
People from Višegrad
Bosniaks of Bosnia and Herzegovina
Bosnia and Herzegovina Muslims
Association football central defenders
Bosnia and Herzegovina footballers
Bosnia and Herzegovina youth international footballers
Bosnia and Herzegovina under-21 international footballers
Bosnia and Herzegovina international footballers
FK Željezničar Sarajevo players
Panionios F.C. players
Maccabi Haifa F.C. players
K.V. Mechelen players
Akhisarspor footballers
Altay S.K. footballers
Panetolikos F.C. players
Premier League of Bosnia and Herzegovina players
Super League Greece players
Israeli Premier League players
Belgian Pro League players
Challenger Pro League players
Süper Lig players
TFF First League players
Bosnia and Herzegovina expatriate footballers
Expatriate footballers in Greece
Bosnia and Herzegovina expatriate sportspeople in Greece
Expatriate footballers in Israel
Bosnia and Herzegovina expatriate sportspeople in Israel
Expatriate footballers in Belgium
Bosnia and Herzegovina expatriate sportspeople in Belgium
Expatriate footballers in Turkey
Bosnia and Herzegovina expatriate sportspeople in Turkey